The 1974–75 West Midlands (Regional) League season was the 75th in the history of the West Midlands (Regional) League, an English association football competition for semi-professional and amateur teams based in the West Midlands county, Shropshire, Herefordshire, Worcestershire and southern Staffordshire.

Premier Division

The Premier Division featured 14 clubs which competed in the division last season, along with two new clubs:
Armitage, promoted from Division One
Hednesford, transferred from the Midland League, who also changed name to Hednesford Town

Also, Coventry Amateurs changed name to Coventry Sporting.

League table

References

External links

1974–75
W